Arthur Ashton Carnell (21 March 1862 – 11 September 1940) was a British sport shooter who competed at the 1908 Summer Olympics.

In the 1908 Olympics he won a gold medal in the stationary target small-bore rifle event.

References

External links
profile

1862 births
1940 deaths
British male sport shooters
ISSF rifle shooters
Olympic shooters of Great Britain
Shooters at the 1908 Summer Olympics
English Olympic medallists
Olympic gold medallists for Great Britain
Olympic medalists in shooting
Medalists at the 1908 Summer Olympics